The Heroiv Pratsi (meaning: Heroes of Labor) is a station on Kharkiv Metro's Saltivska Line. The station was opened on 24 October 1986.

The old name of the station was Heroiv Truda (Героев Труда, meaning: Heroes of Labor), which was changed to Ukrainian from Russian language.

Kharkiv Metro stations
Railway stations opened in 1986